Antonio Ricciulli (30 May 1582 – May 1643) was a Roman Catholic prelate who served as Archbishop of Cosenza (1641–1643), Bishop of Caserta (1639–1641), Bishop of Umbriatico (1632–1639), and Bishop of Belcastro (1626–1629).

Biography
Antonio Ricciulli was born in Rogliano, Italy on 30 May 1582.
On 16 November 1626, he was appointed during the papacy of Pope Urban VIII as Bishop of Belcastro. 
He resigned as Bishop of Belcastro in 1629.
On 16 February 1632, he was appointed during the papacy of Pope Urban VIII as Bishop of Umbriatico.
On 7 February 1639, he was appointed during the papacy of Pope Urban VIII as Bishop of Caserta.
On 27 November 1641, he was appointed during the papacy of Pope Urban VIII as Archbishop of Cosenza.
He served as Archbishop of Cosenza until his death in May 1643.

Episcopal succession
While bishop, he was the principal co-consecrator of:

References

External links and additional sources
 (for Chronology of Bishops) 
 (for Chronology of Bishops) 
 (for Chronology of Bishops) 
 (for Chronology of Bishops) 
 (for Chronology of Bishops) 
 (for Chronology of Bishops) 
 (for Chronology of Bishops) 
 (for Chronology of Bishops) 

17th-century Roman Catholic archbishops in the Kingdom of Naples
Bishops appointed by Pope Urban VIII
1582 births
1643 deaths
17th-century Roman Catholic bishops in the Kingdom of Naples